Caquella is a peak in Bolivia with an elevation of  metres. Caquella is within the following mountain ranges: Bolivian Andes and Cordillera Occidental de Bolivia. It is located within the territory of the Bolivian province of Nor Lipez and Its slopes are within the administrative boundaries of the Bolivian commune of Colcha K (V.Martin).

First Ascent 
Caquella was first climbed by Anton Putz and Ria Putz (Germany) August 25th 1984.

Elevation 
Other data from available digital elevation models: ASTER 5950 metres and TanDEM-X 5991 metres. The height of the nearest key col is 4479 meters, leading to a topographic prominence of 1486 meters. Caquella is considered a Mountain Range according to the Dominance System  and its dominance is 24.91%. Its parent peak is Acamarachi and the Topographic isolation is 202.9 kilometers.

References

External links 

 Elevation information about Caquella

 Weather Forecast at Caquella

Five-thousanders of the Andes